The Akademietheater in Vienna, Austria, is the smaller of two performance halls of the Burgtheater organization. It was constructed in the years 1911 to 1913 by architects Fellner & Helmer and is considered today part of Austria's Federal Theatres (Bundestheater). Located on Lisztstrasse, in Vienna's third district, it is attached to its neighboring building, the Konzerthaus, a well-known performance venue for concerts.

External links 

 
 

Theatres in Vienna
Fellner & Helmer buildings
Buildings and structures completed in 1913